Gallinal is a caserío (hamlet) in the Paysandú Department of western Uruguay.

Geography

Population
In 2011 Gallinal had a population of 700.
 
Source: Instituto Nacional de Estadística de Uruguay

References

External links
INE map of Gallinal

Populated places in the Paysandú Department